The West Coast Eagles are a professional Australian rules football club based in Perth, Western Australia. The club was founded in 1986 as one of two expansion teams in the Australian Football League (AFL), then known as the Victorian Football League. The club plays its home games at Perth Stadium and has its headquarters at Lathlain Park. The West Australian Football Commission wholly owns the West Coast Eagles and the Fremantle Football Club, the AFL's other Western Australian team.

The West Coast Eagles are one of the most successful clubs in the AFL era (1990 onwards). The Eagles have since won premierships in 1994, 2006 and 2018. They are one of the most profitable and influential clubs in the league, and as of 2021 have more members than any other club with over 106,000.

West Coast also fields a women's team in the AFLW competition and a reserves team in the WAFL.

History

1986–1989: Formation and first years

The West Coast Eagles were selected in 1986 as one of two expansion teams to enter the Victorian Football League (VFL) the following season, along with the Brisbane Bears. Ron Alexander was appointed as the team's inaugural coach in September 1986, with the inaugural squad, comprising a majority of players from the West Australian Football League (WAFL), unveiled in late October. The Eagles benefitted from a strong WAFL competition and very loose transfer restrictions relative to later expansion teams, with early success seen as a key factor to promoting the new national competition. The team's first senior match in the VFL was played against  at Subiaco Oval in late March 1987, with West Coast defeating Richmond by 14 points. Having won eleven games and lost eleven games for the season, the club finished eighth out of fourteen teams. The club made the finals for the first time in 1988, but lost form the following season, winning only seven games to finish 11th on the ladder.

1990–1999: Malthouse era and dual premierships

Todd was sacked at the end of the 1989 season, and was replaced by Mick Malthouse, who had previously coached .

John Worsfold replaced Steve Malaxos as captain for the 1991 season, and the club finished the season as minor premiers for the first time, losing only three games. Peter Sumich kicked 111 goals during the season, becoming the first West Coast player to reach a century of goals, as well as the first-ever left-footer. In 1992, West Coast finished fourth on the ladder, but again progressed to the grand final, defeating  by 28 points to become the first team based outside Victoria to win a premiership. Having slipped to third in 1993, the club finished as minor premiers the following season, and went on to again defeat Geelong in the grand final to win its second premiership in three years. In 1995, a second AFL team based in Western Australia, the Fremantle Football Club, with the two clubs' subsequent rivalry branded as the "Western Derby". West Coast made the finals in every year that remained in the 1990s, but failed to reach another grand final, with a fourth-place finish in 1996 their best result. Worsfold retired at the end of the 1998 season, and was replaced by his vice-captain, Guy McKenna, who served as captain until his retirement two seasons later.

2000–2005: Struggles, rebuild and Worsfold era

The 2000 and 2001 seasons were marked by a rapid decrease in form after the loss of several key senior players, culminating in a 14th-place in 2001, at the time the worst in the club's history. Round eighteen of the 2000 season marked the club's final match at the WACA Ground, which had been used concurrently with Subiaco Oval since the club's inception.

The club made the finals in 2002, 2003, and 2004, but each time failed to progress past the elimination final. Ben Cousins was made sole captain of the club in 2002, having shared the role with Dean Kemp the previous season. During this time, the team was boosted by a number of high picks in the AFL draft gained as a result of the previous poor finishes. Chris Judd, who had been taken with pick three in the 2001 National draft, won the Brownlow Medal as the best player in the competition in 2004, becoming the first West Coast player to win the award. In 2005, the Eagles won 15 of their first 16 games, and were 20 points clear on top of the ladder at stages, but they eventually slipped to second behind . They progressed to the grand final against , where they were defeated by four points. Chris Judd received the Norm Smith Medal.

For the second consecutive year, the Brownlow Medal was won by an Eagles player, with Ben Cousins and Daniel Kerr finishing first and second, respectively.

2006–2010: Third premiership, controversies and final misses

West Coast finished as minor premiers for a third time in 2006, with seventeen wins from 22 games. The two grand finals in 2005 and 2006 were part of a series of close games between the two clubs that resulted in a total difference of thirteen points across six games, an AFL record.

The club finished third during the regular 2007 season, but after a series of late-season injuries lost both its games during the final series. During the past few seasons, the club had been impacted by a series of highly publicised off-field controversies involving allegations of recreational drug use, nightclub assaults, and links to outlawed motorcycle gangs. Michael Gardiner was traded after crashing his car while drunk, and Ben Cousins resigned the captaincy of the club prior to the 2006 season after being charged with evading a police breath test, with Chris Judd taking over as captain. Darren Glass, the club's full-back since the retirement of Ashley McIntosh in 2003, was then appointed captain. These controversies were followed by a series of poor seasons on-field, culminating in the club's first wooden spoon, after winning only four games in 2010. The three-year period between 2008 and 2010 was the longest time in the club's history without a finals appearance.

2011–2013: Breakthrough years

The Eagles went into 2013 as premiership favourites, although injuries and poor form saw the club finish in thirteenth position on the ladder, with the club losing its final three games by an average of 71 points. Coach John Worsfold resigned on 5 September 2013.

2014–present: Simpson era and fourth premiership
Former  player Adam Simpson was announced as the team's new coach for the 2014 season. Darren Glass was initially renamed as captain, but retired from football after round 12. He was replaced by five acting co-captains for the remainder of the season – Shannon Hurn, Josh Kennedy, Eric Mackenzie, Matt Priddis, and Scott Selwood. West Coast had a strong preseason and won their opening three matches, although they eventually finished in ninth position. During the season the club were labelled as "flat track bullies" due to beating lower placed teams by large margins, yet failing to defeat teams above them on the ladder. Midfielder Matt Priddis became the third Eagles player to win a Brownlow medal, winning the 2014 medal at the end of the season.

On 7 December 2014, Shannon Hurn was appointed as sole captain for 2015 and beyond. At the start of the 2015 season, West Coast lost two of their opening three games and suffered injuries to key players. Despite this, they went on to lose only three more games for the rest of the home and away season, finishing behind local rivals  in second position. The following season ended up being a disappointment, with the team failing to produce another top 4 finish in spite of a late form reversal. In their elimination final, the heavily favoured Eagles were defeated at home by the Western Bulldogs, who went on to claim the 2016 premiership.

In 2017, West Coast finished in eighth position on the table. A thrilling finish against Adelaide in the last game at Subiaco was enough to put them into their third consecutive finals series under Simpson. Their percentage of 105.7% edged out Melbourne, who finished with the same number of wins and an almost identical percentage of 105.2%. Remarkably, their elimination final away against  ended up a tie after regulation time and was sent to extra time. The Eagles controversially won after the siren courtesy of a Luke Shuey goal.

Few predicted West Coast would contend in season 2018, with most having them outside the 8. After losing the inaugural game at the new Optus Stadium against the Sydney Swans, West Coast went on to win 10 in a row to surge to top of the ladder, including defeating Hawthorn at Etihad and Richmond, the eventual minor premiers. However, injuries to star forwards Josh Kennedy and Jack Darling saw them struggle, losing 3 games in a row including to Sydney for a second this time at the SCG. Despite injuries, they managed to rebound and stabilise. The Eagle's form at the MCG had long been criticised, and round 17 against an in-form Collingwood who had won 7 of the previous matches was seen as a stern test. The match was fairly close throughout, until the Eagles got on top in the last ten minutes of the third quarter to win by a commanding 35 points. The victory was bittersweet, however, as the All-Australian ruckman Nic Naitanui went down with an ACL for the second time after his 2016 injury, putting him out for the rest of the season. In round 20 star midfielder Andrew Gaff was suspended for 8 weeks for a hit on Fremantle player Andrew Brayshaw. Following this many dismissed the Eagles, believing they were unable to win the flag. The following week there was a bright spot in a dark period, as Jeremy McGovern kicked a goal after the siren at Adelaide Oval to pinch the game from Port Adelaide, in similar circumstances to West Coast's win over Port in the 2017 elimination final.

The Eagles finished the 2018 home and away season second on the ladder with 16 wins and 6 losses – their best result since 2006 – earning the right to host the second qualifying final against third-placed Collingwood at Optus Stadium. Collingwood. led for most of the close, hard-fought match, before the Eagles again pulled away in the last quarter to win by 16 points.

In the 2018 second preliminary final, the Eagles faced the fifth-placed Melbourne Demons, a team whose impressive end-of-season form had begun with a victory over the Eagles at Optus Stadium in round 22. What was touted as a close-fought match instead became a blowout. West Coast led 10.9.69 to 0.6.6 at half time, Melbourne becoming the first team since 1927 to fail to score a goal in a half of finals football. West Coast eventually won by 66 points, 121 to 55.

In the 2018 grand final, West Coast again played Collingwood, who had upset Richmond in the first preliminary final the week prior. In a match dubbed an all-time classic, Collingwood led by as much as 29 points in the first quarter, but the resilient Eagles managed to claw their way back into the contest, and with just over 2 minutes left, a brilliant play set up by a Jeremy McGovern intercept mark and a further sensational mark by first year player Liam Ryan saw Dom Sheed score a goal from a tight angle to put the Eagles 4 points in front. The Eagles went on to win 79 to 74, claiming their fourth premiership in front of 100,022 at the MCG. Luke Shuey won the Norm Smith Medal.

The Eagles started their 2019 premiership defence in indifferent fashion, suffering three heavy defeats in the first six weeks of the 2019 season. The reigning premiers recovered magnificently, winning 12 of their next fourteen matches, but missed out on a spot in the top four after an upset 38-point loss to Hawthorn in round 23. The Eagles finished fifth on the AFL ladder with a 15–7 win-loss record. They thrashed Essendon by 55 points in the first elimination final but their premiership defence was brought to a premature end the following week, losing to minor premiers Geelong by 20 points in the first semi-final.

The 2020 season began with a lacklustre win over Melbourne in Round 1 in March, after which followed a hiatus due to the disruptions caused by the COVID-19 virus. Games resumed in June, with West Coast playing their games in a Queensland hub environment, going 0–3 in June to begin Round 5 in 16th place. From there, West Coast recovered to sit in 5th place with a record of 12–5 at the end of Round 18. Despite being undefeated at their Perth home ground during the regular season, the Eagles bowed out in the first week of the finals after an upset one-point defeat to Collingwood in the first elimination final at Optus Stadium.

The 2021 season would prove to be the end of a successful era for the Eagles. West Coast struggled to find their best form throughout the year and would ultimately miss the finals for the first time since 2014, finishing ninth on the ladder with 10 wins and 12 losses. With crosstown rival Fremantle finishing 11th, it was the first season since 2009 that neither Western Australian team would feature in the finals series.

Finance and ownership

The West Coast Eagles have been owned in full by the West Australian Football Commission (WAFC) since 1989. The club was originally owned and operated by Indian Pacific Limited, a publicly listed company that was delisted from the Australian Stock Exchange in 1990 after 75% of the shares were bought out by the WAFC. The last minority shareholders were bought out in 2000. West Coast pay approximately $3 million in rent to the WAFC for the use of Subiaco Oval, and 50–70% of overall profits. In 2001, a South African investment company, Southern African Investments Ltd. (SAIL), had proposed a AUD$25-million deal for a 49-percent stake in the club, with the bid being rejected in 2003. In 2011, it was reported that the AFL had lobbied to take over the ownership of both the Eagles and the Fremantle Football Club from the WAFC.

West Coast is currently one of the most financially successful clubs in the AFL, both in terms of revenue and profit. The club's football department spending over the 2011 season was reported as $18.6 million, second to Collingwood.

In the AFL annual report of 2017 the West Coast Eagles were fifth in terms of revenue across the Australian Football League ($64,013,222), however, all other clubs with higher revenue receive monies from poker machines.

In 2018, the West Coast Eagles were the highest earning club in terms of revenue, reporting an income of $82,265,015. They also had total assets of $106,229,217 and reported a profit of $7,621,284. These figures were all league records and further established West Coast's status as the biggest club in the AFL. They do not earn any poker machine income, which is attributable for significant portions of their rivals' income. They signed a new sponsorship deal with online mortgage broker Lendi, as well as naming agreements to its training facility with Mineral Resources. The major sponsors for the 2021 season are Hungry Jack's, Lendi and Audi.

Membership and attendance

Membership 
In 2011, the West Coast Eagles had 54,745 members, which was a club record at the time, and the fourth-highest overall in the AFL. Membership numbers were limited by the capacity of Subiaco Oval, which held 43,500 seats, with 39,000 reserved exclusively for club members. In 2012, the cost of an adult club membership was $283, the most of any club in the AFL. At that time, the waiting list was in excess of 20,000 people, or around four years. In July 2015, the club reached a record high of more than 60,000 members, which was the highest for a club in Western Australia, as well as being the sixth highest in the league.

Membership expanded rapidly after the club moved its home games to Optus Stadium and won the 2018 premiership. In 2019, the club reached 90,445 members, becoming the second club in history to pass the 90,000 mark and having the second highest membership in the competition. The club recorded more members than any other AFL team in 2020 (100,776) and 2021 (106,422).

Attendance 
The highest individual crowd to watch a West Coast game at Optus Stadium is 59,608 which was between West Coast and Melbourne in the preliminary final of 2018. The highest-attended home game at Subiaco Oval was against  in the 2012 elimination final, which was attended by 41,790 people.

In 2011, 455,899 people attended West Coast home games, equating to an average of 37,992 people per game. In 2018, West Coast had the second highest home ground attendance of any AFL club, averaging 53,250 for its 11 home games (the highest was Richmond, which averaged 61,175).

The highest attendance for any game featuring West Coast was against  in the 2018 grand final at the Melbourne Cricket Ground, attended by 100,022 people. In terms of television audience, on average 519,000 people viewed West Coast Eagles games in 2011, with a high of 1,074,000 viewers for the round 16 game against .

Number one ticket holder 
The number-one ticket holder is a position in most AFL clubs give to a well-known supporter of the club. West Coast's website lists "longevity of service", "passion for the club", "contribution to the community of Western Australia" and "the level at which they are recognised in their chosen profession by the community" as criteria for the position. Number-one ticket holders generally serve for two years.

Club identity

Symbols and uniform

West Coast's official colours are royal blue and gold. The club had previously used navy blue in place of royal blue between 1995 and 2017, but returned to the club's original colours prior to the 2018 season.

The club's current logo features the head of a wedge-tailed eagle in the royal blue and gold colours of the club with the words "West Coast Eagles" written underneath. It was introduced prior to the 2018 season and aimed to present a more realistic portrayal of an eagle than the previous logo. The previous logo, in use between 2000 and 2017, featured a more heavily stylised wedge-tailed eagle. The club's current and former logos have all incorporated a stylised eagle's head, always facing east (i.e. towards the right, where east appears on most maps) to represent the eagle eyeing off its prey in the eastern states.

As part of the AFL's Mascot Manor program, a bald eagle club mascot, Rick "The Rock", was created in 2003 to promote the club to junior players. The mascot is in part named after the song. A real wedge-tailed eagle, Auzzie, has flown around the field before matches at West Coast home games since 2007.

In 2018, the Eagles' home guernsey saw a return of the club's former 'royal blue' design used prior to 1999, updated to feature the club's new logo. The club's away strip, which already used a variation of the design with the royal blue and gold colours swapped around, as updated to feature the new logo but otherwise remained relatively unchanged. Between 2000 and 2015, the club's home jumper design featured a stylised eagle on a tricolour of navy blue, white and gold. This jumper was introduced during the 2000 season along with a much-criticised ochre away jumper as part of a rebrand of the club to coincide with the new millennium. The ochre jumper was later dropped at the end of 2002 in favour of an updated version of the club's former royal blue jumper, which was worn during their 1992 and 1994 premierships. Starting in 2010, the Eagles also wore a third, predominantly white guernsey in order to avoid visual clashes with teams who used similar colours. It was dropped as the club's designated clash jumper at the end of 2016, in favour of an updated version of their original 1987 guernsey. During October 2015, the club announced a navy version of the royal blue jumper would replace the tricolour guernsey as the club's home uniform from 2016, and was used until the introduction of the current design. The Eagles rebranded to its current brand on 1 November 2017, ahead of the club's move to Perth Stadium from 2018.

Uniform evolution
West Coast's uniform changes throughout their history:

Sponsorship

As part of West Coast's (and the AFL's in general) efforts to develop the game outside of Australia, the club partners with a number of internationally based football clubs, providing them with guernseys and other equipment. There are currently Eagles-affiliated clubs (also referred to as "sister clubs") in Cambodia (the Cambodian Eagles), Canada (the Toronto Eagles), China (the Shanghai Eagles), Italy (the Milano Eagles), and Sweden (the Karlstad Eagles). West Coast is also responsible for sponsoring FootyWILD, a program similar to Auskick held in KwaZulu-Natal, a province of South Africa.

Song
The club's official team song is "We're the Eagles", composed by Kevin Peek, a former member of the progressive rock band Sky, and initially recorded at Peek's studio in Roleystone. The current version of the song goes as follows:

 Born is pride,
 from isolation
 Our fortress built,
 we cross the nation
 Our colours share,
 the West Coast sky
 Our will to win will never die,
 We're the Eagles, the West Coast Eagles
 And we’re here to show you why
 We’re the big birds, kings of the big game
 We're the Eagles, we’re flying high

 We stick together,
 through thick and thin
 We grow as champions
 from within
 Our club knows,
 it's more than winning
 It's West Coast magic,
 and it's just beginning
 We're the Eagles, the West Coast Eagles
 And we’re here to show you why
 We’re the big birds, kings of the big game
 We're the Eagles, we’re flying high

 We're the Eagles, we’re flying high

The original 1987 version, which was played after the 1992 and 1994 grand final victories, featured anti-Victorian verses ("For years, they took the best of us and claimed them for their own... So watch out, all you know-alls, all you wise men from the East") and a different musical structure. It was eventually altered in the late-1990s. The re-recorded version had new verses added by Ken Walther, who also composed Fremantle's 1995 team song. A modified version of the late-1990s song has been used from 2018 to 2019. Ahead of the Eagles' appearance in the 2015 Grand Final, the West Australian Symphony Orchestra created an orchestral version of the song. In 2020, the club announced an updated version of the song, composed by Ian Berney and with vocals from Ian Kenny, both of Perth band Birds of Tokyo. "Eagle Rock", a 1971 song recorded by Daddy Cool, is also traditionally played at home games after wins.

Headquarters, training and administration base
The West Coast Eagles had its original primary training and administration base at Subiaco Oval from 1987 until 2019, the club then moved its primary training and administration base to Mineral Resources Park in 2019.

List of seasons

Club honours

Club achievements

Life members
Players who have played 150 games for the club are automatically inducted as life members of the club. Other players, administrators and coaches that have made an outstanding contribution to the club have also been inducted. No life members were inducted in 2001. The following players, coaches and administrators are life members of the club:

Source:

Team of the Decade

In 1996 as part of the AFL's centenary celebrations, and the club's 10-year celebrations, the Eagles named a team of the decade.

Team 20

In 2006 the West Coast Eagles named a greatest team of the past twenty years as part of the club's twentieth anniversary celebrations:

Team 25
In 2011 the West Coast Eagles named a greatest team of the past twenty five years as part of the club's twenty fifth anniversary celebrations:

Individual awards

Hall of Fame inductees
The Australian Football Hall of Fame was established in 1996:
 Ross Glendinning – 2000
 John Todd – 2003
 Peter Matera – 2006
 Dean Kemp – 2007
 Glen Jakovich – 2008
 Guy McKenna – 2009
 Dean Cox – 2020
 Chris Judd- 2021
 Robert Wiley- 2021

West Coast Eagles Hall of Fame inductees
 Bill Sutherland (trainer) 2011
 Chris Lewis (player) – 2011
 Peter Matera (player) – 2011
 Dean Kemp (player) – 2011
 Glen Jakovich (player) – 2011
 Guy McKenna (player) – 2011
 John Worsfold (player/coach) – 2011
 Mick Malthouse (coach) – 2011
 Michael Brennan (player) – 2014
 Brett Heady (player) – 2014
 Chris Mainwaring (player) – 2014
 Ashley McIntosh (player) – 2014
 Peter Sumich (player) – 2014
 Trevor Nisbett (administrator) – 2014
 Chris Judd (player) – 2021
 Darren Glass (player) – 2021
 Dean Cox (player) – 2021

Brownlow Medal winners

The Brownlow Medal is awarded to the best player in the competition during the home-and-away season as voted by the umpires:

Winners
 Chris Judd (2004)
 Ben Cousins (2005)
 Matt Priddis (2014)

Runners-up
 Craig Turley (1991)
 Peter Matera (1994, 1997)
 Ben Cousins (2003 (equal))
 Daniel Kerr (2005, 2007)
 Matt Priddis (2015)

AFLPA Awards
The Leigh Matthews Trophy is awarded to the best player in the competition as voted by the AFL Players Association:
 Ben Cousins – 2005
 Chris Judd – 2006

The Best Captain Award is awarded to the best captain as voted by the AFL Players Association:
 Ross Glendinning – 1988

The Best First-Year Player Award is awarded to the best first-year player as voted by the AFL Players Association:
 Daniel Kerr – 2001
 Chris Judd – 2002

Norm Smith Medal winners
The Norm Smith Medal is awarded to the player judged best-on-ground in the AFL Grand Final:
 Peter Matera – 1992
 Dean Kemp – 1994
 Chris Judd – 2005 (losing side)
 Andrew Embley – 2006
 Luke Shuey – 2018

Coleman Medal winners
The Coleman Medal is awarded to the player who kicks the most goals in the AFL competition during the home-and-away season:
 Scott Cummings (88 goals) – 1999
 Josh Kennedy (75 goals) – 2015
 Josh Kennedy (80 goals) – 2016

AFL Rising Star winners
The AFL Rising Star is awarded to the best rookie player in the competition during a particular season:
 Ben Cousins – 1996

Goal of the Year winners
The Goal of the Year is awarded to the player judged to have kicked the best goal during a particular season:
 Ben Cousins – 1999
 Mark Merenda – 2001
 Daniel Kerr – 2003
 Chris Judd – 2005

Mark of the Year winners
The Mark of the Year is awarded to the player judged to have taken the best mark during a particular season:
 Ashley Sampi – 2004
 Nic Naitanui – 2015
 Liam Ryan – 2019

All-Australian selection
The All-Australian team is a representative team consisting of the best players during a particular season. Prior to 1991 it was awarded to the best players in each interstate football carnival.

VFL Team of the Year
Prior to 1991 the VFL Team of the Year was announced each year, consisting of the best players during that season in the Victorian Football League.

Players and staff

Squad

Covid top-up list

For the 2022 season, in the event an AFL club has less than 28 players available due to Covid related reasons, each club can select from a list of 20 state league players who can be called up to AFL level. West Coast has selected 20 players from the WAFL. In Round 2 of the AFL season, West Coast became the first AFL team to need to call on this top-up list, when 12 players who played in Round 1 were unable to play due to Covid-19 health and safety protocols.

Coaching staff

Club officials

Rivalries

The club's strongest rivalry is with the Fremantle Football Club, the only other AFL club based in Western Australia. The two teams play off in the Western Derby twice each home-and-away season. Overall, 52 derbies have been played, with the Eagles winning 32 and Fremantle winning 20. West Coast currently hold the record for the most consecutive derby wins after winning their 11th in a row in round 7 of the 2021 AFL season. Derbies usually incorporate a near sold-out crowd. From 1995 to 2017, when the club played at Subiaco Oval, the average crowd was 39,910 people per game, out of a total capacity of 43,600 people. From 2018 to 2021, the average crowd at Optus Stadium was 56,033 (excluding two games in 2020 and 2021 played with reduced or no crowd due to COVID-19 restrictions), out of a total capacity of 60,000 people.

The club's earliest rivalry was with VFL powerhouse the Hawthorn Hawks. This rivalry stemmed from a series of memorable matches in the early 1990s, most notably the 1991 Grand Final. It was considered the first ever interstate rivalry in the competition, although it had fallen into irrelevance in later years. 24 years later in 2015, the two clubs met again in another grand Final, which Hawthorn won in convincing fashion.

This sequence included three one-point matches between the 2006 qualifying final and round one of the 2007 season.

Game and ladder records
 Biggest winning margin: 135 points – 26.21 (177) vs. Adelaide 5.12 (42), Subiaco Oval, 13 August 1995
 Biggest losing margin: 142 points – 1.12 (18) vs. Essendon 25.10 (160), Windy Hill, 15 July 1989
 Highest score: 29.18 (192) vs. Brisbane Bears, W.A.C.A., 17 April 1988
 Lowest score: 1.12 (18) vs. Essendon, Windy Hill, 15 July 1989
 Highest score conceded: 30.21 (201) vs. Sydney, S.C.G., 19 July 1987
 Lowest score conceded: 2.8 (20) vs. Melbourne, Subiaco Oval, 24 March 1991
 Highest aggregate score: 295 points – Carlton 29.17 (191) vs. West Coast Eagles 15.14 (104), Princes Park, 18 April 1987
 Lowest aggregate score: 76 points – Footscray 7.11 (53) vs. West Coast Eagles 3.5 (23), Whitten Oval, 23 August 1992
 Most goals in a match: Scott Cummings, 14 goals vs. Adelaide, W.A.C.A., 1 April 2000
 Highest crowd: 100,022 vs. Collingwood, MCG, 29 September 2018
 Lowest crowd: 210 vs. Adelaide, The Gabba, 11 July 2020
 Highest WA crowd: 59,608 vs. Melbourne, Optus Stadium, 22 September 2018
 Lowest WA crowd: 12,803 vs. St. Kilda, W.A.C.A., 12 May 1988
 Highest home-and-away season crowd: 62,957 vs. Collingwood, MCG, 23 June 2012

VFL/AFL finishing positions (1987–present)

Head-to-head record
Played:796 Won: 453 Drawn: 6 Lost:337 (Last updated – End of 2020 AFL season)

Source:

AFL Women's team 

In September 2017, West Coast Eagles were granted a license by the AFL to compete in the AFL Women's league from the start of the 2020 season. The club shares home games between Lathlain Park, Perth Stadium and Leederville Oval.

See also

 Australian rules football in Western Australia
 List of West Coast Eagles coaches
 List of West Coast Eagles players
 List of West Coast Eagles records

References 

Bibliography

External links 

 

 
Australian Football League clubs
Australian rules football clubs in Western Australia
Australian rules football clubs established in 1986
Sporting clubs in Perth, Western Australia
1986 establishments in Australia
West Australian Football League clubs